Vitis vinifera, the common grape vine, is a species of flowering plant, native to the Mediterranean region, Central Europe, and southwestern Asia, from Morocco and Portugal north to southern Germany and east to northern Iran. There are currently between 5,000 and 10,000 varieties of Vitis vinifera grapes though only a few are of commercial significance for wine and table grape production.

The wild grape is often classified as Vitis vinifera sylvestris (in some classifications considered Vitis sylvestris), with Vitis vinifera vinifera restricted to cultivated forms. Domesticated vines have hermaphrodite flowers, but sylvestris is dioecious (male and female flowers on separate plants) and pollination is required for fruit to develop.

Grapes can be eaten fresh or dried to produce raisins, sultanas, and currants. Grape leaves are used in the cuisine of many cultures. The fresh grapes can also be processed into juice that is fermented to make wine and vinegar. Cultivars of Vitis vinifera form the basis of the majority of wines produced around the world.  All of the familiar wine varieties belong to Vitis vinifera, which is cultivated on every continent except for Antarctica, and in all the major wine regions of the world.

History

Prehistory

Wild grapes were harvested by neolithic foragers and early farmers. For thousands of years, the fruit has been harvested for both medicinal and nutritional value; its history is intimately entwined with the history of wine.

Changes in pip (seed) shape (narrower in domesticated forms) and distribution point to domestication occurring about 3500–3000 BC, in southwest Asia, South Caucasus (Georgia), or the Western Black Sea shore region (Romania and Bulgaria). The earliest evidence of domesticated grapes has been found at Gadachrili Gora, near the village of Imiri, Marneuli Municipality, in southeastern Georgia; carbon-dating points to the date of about 6000 BC. Grape pips dating back to the 5th–4th millennium BC were also found in Shulaveri; others dating back to the 4th millennium BC were also found in Khizanaant Gora, all in the country of Georgia.

Antiquity
Cultivation of the domesticated grape spread to other parts of the Old World in pre-historic or early historic times. The first written accounts of grapes and wine can be found in the Epic of Gilgamesh, an ancient Sumerian text from the 3rd millennium BC. There are also numerous hieroglyphic references from ancient Egypt, according to which wine was reserved exclusively for priests, state functionaries and the pharaoh.

Hesiod in his Works and Days gives detailed descriptions of grape harvests and wine making techniques, and there are also many references in Homer. Greek colonists then introduced these practices in their colonies, especially in southern Italy (Magna Grecia), which was even known as Enotria due to its propitious climate.

The Etruscans improved wine making techniques and developed an export trade even beyond the Mediterranean basin. The ancient Romans further developed the techniques learnt from the Etruscans, as shown by numerous works of literature containing information that is still valid today: De Agri Cultura (around 160 BC) by Cato the Elder,  De re rustica by Marcus Terentius Varro, the Georgics by Virgil and De re rustica by Columella. During the 3rd and 4th centuries AD, the long crisis of the Roman Empire generated instability in the countryside which led to a reduction of viticulture in general, which was mainly sustained only close to towns and cities and along coastlines.

Medieval era
Between the 5th and 10th centuries, viticulture was sustained almost exclusively by the different religious orders in monasteries. The Benedictines and others extended the grape growing limit northwards and also planted new vineyards at higher altitudes than was customary before. Apart from 'ecclesiastical' viticulture, there also developed, especially in France, a 'noble' viticulture, practiced by the aristocracy as a symbol of prestige. Grape growing was a significant economic activity in the Middle east up to the 7th century, when the expansion of Islam caused it to decline.

Early modern period
Between the Low Middle Ages and the Renaissance, viticulture began to flourish again. Demographic pressure, population concentration in towns and cities, and the increased spending power of artisans and merchants gave rise to increased investment in viticulture, which became economically feasible once more. Much was written during the Renaissance on grape growing and wine production, favouring a more scientific approach.  This literature can be considered the origin of modern ampelography.

Grapes followed European colonies around the world, coming to North America around the 17th century, and to Africa, South America and Australia. In North America it formed hybrids with native species from the genus Vitis; some of these were intentional hybrids created to combat phylloxera, an insect pest which affected the European grapevine to a much greater extent than North American ones and in fact managed to devastate European wine production in a matter of years. Later, North American rootstocks became widely used to graft V. vinifera cultivars so as to withstand the presence of phylloxera.

Contemporary period

In the second half of the 20th century there was a shift in attitude in viticulture from traditional techniques to the scientific method based on fields such as microbiology, chemistry and ampelography. This change came about also due to changes in economic and cultural aspects and in the way of life and in the consumption habits of wide sectors of the population starting to demand quality products.

In 2007, Vitis vinifera was the fourth angiosperm species whose genome was completely sequenced. These data contributed significantly to understanding the evolution of plants and also how the aromatic characteristics of wine are determined in part by the plant's genes. This work was a collaboration between Italian researchers (Consorzio Interuniversitario Nazionale per la Biologia Molecolare delle Piante, Istituto di Genomica Applicata) and French researchers (Genoscope and Institut National de la Recherche Agronomique).

Also in 2007, scientists from Australia's Commonwealth Scientific and Industrial Research Organisation (CSIRO), working in the Cooperative Research Centre for Viticulture, reported that their "research suggests that extremely rare and independent mutations in two genes [VvMYBA1 and VvMYBA2 of red grapes] produced a single white grapevine that was the parent of almost all of the world's white grape varieties. If only one gene had been mutated, most grapes would still be red and we would not have the more than 3000 white grape cultivars available today."

Description

They are glossy dark green on top, light green below, usually hairless.

The vine attaches to supports by tendrils. The stems, called twigs, grow through their tip, the cauline apex. A branch consists of several internodes separated by knots, which grow the leaves, flowers, tendrils and between-core and where to train future buds. During their hardening, the twigs become woody branches that can reach a great length.  Its roots usually sink to a depth of 2 to 5 meters and sometimes up to 12–15 meters or even more.

The species typically occurs in humid forests and streamsides.

Inflorescences
Their flowers, small and greenish to white, are grouped in inflorescences and their fruits, of different shapes depending on the subspecies, are berries grouped in clusters. The calyx is single-leaf with 5 short, deciduous teeth. The corolla consists of five petals, fused at the top and base, and then falls off in its entirety. Opposite the petals there are five stamens interspersed with glands. The upper ovary bears a very short style with a button-shaped stigma. The wild vine is a dioecious plant, the male and female flowers arise on different plants, but the cultivated forms are hermaphroditic, allowing self-pollination.

Distribution
V. vinifera accounts for the majority of world wine production; all of the most familiar grape varieties used for wine production belong to V. vinifera.

In Europe, Vitis vinifera is concentrated in the central and southern regions; in Asia, in the western regions such as Anatolia, the Caucasus, the Middle East, and in China; in Africa, along the northern Mediterranean coast and in South Africa; in North America, in California and also other areas like Michigan, New Mexico, New York, Oregon, Washington state, British Columbia, Ontario and Québec; in South America in Chile, Argentina, Uruguay, Peru and Brazil; and in Oceania in Australia and New Zealand.

Cultivation 

Use of grapes is known to date back to Neolithic times, following the discovery in 1996 of 7,000-year-old wine storage jars in present-day northern Iran. Further evidence shows the Mesopotamians and Ancient Egyptians had vine plantations and winemaking skills. Greek philosophers praised the healing powers of grapes both whole and in the form of wine. Vitis vinifera cultivation and winemaking in China began during the Han Dynasty in the 2nd century with the importation of the species from Ta-Yuan.  However, wild vine "mountain grapes" like Vitis thunbergii were being used for wine making before that time. In traditional medicine of India V. vinifera is used in prescriptions for cough, respiratory tract catarrh, subacute cases of enlarged liver and spleen, as well as in alcohol-based tonics (Aasavs).

In the Mediterranean Basin, leaves and young stems are traditionally used to feed sheep and goats after grapevine pruning.

Using the sap of grapevines, European folk healers sought to cure skin and eye diseases. Other historical uses include the leaves being used to stop bleeding, pain and inflammation of hemorrhoids. Unripe grapes were used for treating sore throats, and raisins were given as treatments for consumption (tuberculosis), constipation and thirst. Ripe grapes were used for the treatment of cancer, cholera, smallpox, nausea, skin and eye infections as well as kidney and liver diseases.

Seedless grape varieties were developed to appeal to consumers, but researchers are now discovering that many of the healthful properties of grapes may actually come from the seeds themselves, thanks to their enriched phytochemical content.

Grapevine leaves are filled with minced meat (such as lamb, pork or beef), rice and onions in the making of Balkan traditional dolma.

A popular cultivar in Australia, Vitis 'Ornamental Grape', derived from Vitis vinifera x Vitis rupestris, is used in gardens for its impressive foliage that turn brilliant red, scarlet, purple and/or orange in autumn. Originally bred in France, it thrives in a range of climates from hot and dry, to cool moist and subtropical, with different soil types benefitting the plant.

Chemistry

Phenolics 
V. vinifera contains many phenolic compounds. Anthocyanins can be found in the skin of the berries, hydroxycinnamic acids in the pulp and condensed tannins of the proanthocyanidins type in the seeds. Stilbenoids can be found in the skin and in wood.

Stilbenoids 
Trans-resveratrol is a phytoalexin produced against the growth of fungal pathogens such as Botrytis cinerea and delta-viniferin is another grapevine phytoalexin produced following fungal infection by Plasmopara viticola.
 Astringin

Anthocyanins 
Vitis vinifera red cultivars are rich in anthocyanins that impart their colour to the berries (generally in the skin). The 5 most basic anthocyanins found in grape are:
 Cyanidin-3-O-glucoside
 Delphinidin-3-O-glucoside
 Malvidin-3-O-glucoside
 Petunidin-3-O-glucoside
 Peonidin-3-O-glucoside

Cultivars like Graciano may also contain :
 acetylated anthocyanins
 Cyanidin-3-(6-acetyl)-glucoside
 Delphinidin-3-(6-acetyl)-glucoside
 Malvidin-3-(6-acetyl)-glucoside
 Petunidin-3-(6-acetyl)-glucoside
 Peonidin-3-(6-acetyl)-glucoside

 coumaroylated anthocyanins
 Cyanidin-3-(6-p-coumaroyl)-glucoside
 Delphinidin-3-(6-p-coumaroyl)-glucoside
 Malvidin-3-(6-p-coumaroyl)-glucoside cis
 Malvidin-3-(6-p-coumaroyl)-glucoside trans
 Petunidin-3-(6-p-coumaroyl)-glucoside
 Peonidin-3-(6-p-coumaroyl)-glucoside

 caffeoylated anthocyanins
 Malvidin-3-(6-p-caffeoyl)-glucoside
 Peonidin-3-(6-p-caffeoyl)-glucoside

Other chemicals 
Isoprenoid monoterpenes are present in grape, above all acyclic linalool, geraniol, nerol, citronellol, homotrienol and monocyclic α-terpineol, mostly occurring as glycosides. Carotenoids accumulate in ripening grape berries. Oxidation of carotenoids produces volatile fragments, C13-norisoprenoids. These are strongly odoriferous compounds, such as β-ionone (aroma of viola), damascenone (aroma of exotic fruits), β-damascone (aroma of rose) and β-ionol (aroma of flowers and fruits).  Melatonin, an alkaloid, has been identified in grape. In addition, seeds are rich in unsaturated fatty acids, which helps lowering levels of total cholesterol and LDL cholesterol in the blood.

See also 

 List of grape varieties
 Cru (wine)
 International Grape Genome Program
 List of sequenced plant genomes
 List of sequenced plastomes
 Areni-1 winery

References

Further reading 

Manzi Luigi, La viticoltura e l'enologia al tempo dei romani, Er. Botta, Roma 1883.
Marescalchi Arturo, Dalmasso Giovanni, Storia della vite e del vino in Italia, 3 voll., Unione Italiana Vini, Milano 1931-33-37.

vinifera
Grape varieties
Flora of Europe
Flora of Western Asia
Berries
Viticulture
Plants described in 1753
Taxa named by Carl Linnaeus
Crops originating from Europe
Garden plants of Europe
Vines